The mud blenny (Parablennius lodosus) is a species of combtooth blenny found in the western Indian Ocean, it is known only from Delagoa Bay in Mozambique. This species reaches a length of  SL.

References

Endemic fauna of Mozambique
mud blenny
Fish of Mozambique
Tropical fish
mud blenny